The Grand Center Arts Academy is an arts school in St. Louis, Missouri that focuses on dance, orchestra, band, visual arts, choir, and theater. Opened in 2010, the school is located in the Grand Center arts district, in the redeveloped Carter Carburetor complex at 711 North Grand. It began with the 6th and 7th grades, and graduated its first senior class in May 2016.

References

External links

Schools in St. Louis
Educational institutions established in 2010
Schools of the performing arts in the United States
Midtown St. Louis
2010 establishments in Missouri